Józef Montwiłł  (9 March 1850 in Mitėniškiai (now Kėdainiai district, Lithuania) – 7 February 1911) was a Polish-Lithuanian social worker, bank owner and philanthropist, notable for the many social societies he founded. A descendant of a Lithuanian noble family, Montwiłł inherited a significant fortune, which he further increased through banking and investment. He financed numerous courses for the poor, among them, was a class of painting and arts, run by - among others - Józef Bałzukiewicz and Ivan Trutnev, from which graduated a renowned Lithuanian artist Juozas Zikaras.

In 1898, Montwiłł also financed a monument to Adam Mickiewicz in Vilnius, designed by Tadeusz Stryjeński. As the tsarist authorities did not allow the monument to be placed in open space, it was built inside Saint John's Church. Montwiłł also created the Lutnia Artistic Society and financed the construction of the society's theatre, in currently Lithuanian National Drama Theatre. Among other societies, he formed and financed was the Society of Friends of Sciences, one of the founding members of the Polish Academy of Sciences.

Montwiłł also financed the creation of a Polish school in Vilnius (1907), a city hall in Panevėžys; built already after his death, and the Polish Theatre in Vilnius (in modern times converted to Russian Dramatic Theatre of Lithuania). He died in 1911, and was buried at the Rossa cemetery (Lithuanian: Rasos). His tomb, designed by Zygmunt Otto, was decorated with a sculpture of an angel. Although vandalized in recent times, the tomb remains there. In 1935, a monument to Montwiłł was erected in front of the Franciscan Church. A monument in his honour was built in the square, located in the former Franciscan cemetery in the Trakai Street of Vilnius.

In modern times, the Polish Culture in Lithuania Fund has adopted Montwiłł as its patron.

References 

1850 births
1911 deaths
People from Kėdainiai District Municipality
People from Vilkomirsky Uyezd
Polish Roman Catholics
Members of the 3rd State Duma of the Russian Empire
Polish philanthropists
Polish bankers
Polish businesspeople
Polish economists
19th-century philanthropists
Saint Petersburg State University alumni
Burials at Rasos Cemetery